In the Catholic Church the term minister enjoys a variety of usages. It most commonly refers to the person, whether lay or ordained, who is commissioned to perform some act on behalf of the Catholic Church. It is not a particular office or rank of clergy, as is the case in some other Christian organisations; rather, minister may be used as a collective term for vocational or professional pastoral leaders including clergy (bishops, deacons, priests) and non-clergy (theologians and lay ecclesial ministers). It is also used in reference to the canonical and liturgical administration of sacraments, as part of some offices, and with reference to the exercise of the lay apostolate.

Minister is not used as a form of address (e.g., Minister Jones) in the Catholic Church.

Specific distinction in terminology may be found in various documents, among others: Participation of the Lay Faithful in the Presbyter Ministry.

Lay ministers

The Catholic Church calls people to the responsible stewardship of their time and talent in support of the Catholic Church. This often takes the form of volunteering for a specific lay ministry, most of which are liturgical, catechetical, or involved in pastoral care and social justice.

Liturgical lay ministries include lectors (ministers of the Word) who proclaim scriptural (the Bible) passages during the Liturgy of the Word, altar servers and acolytes who assist the presider at the altar, cantors and music ministers who lead the singing, extraordinary ministers of Holy Communion who serve during Mass and/or who take Holy Communion to the sick and homebound, and ushers or ministers of hospitality who direct the seating and procession of the assembly.

Catechetical lay ministries include catechists (Sunday school teachers and teachers at Catholic schools), dismissal leaders (ministers who lead RCIA catechumens on Sundays), retreat leaders, youth group leaders, and Scout religious emblems counselors.

Ecclesial ministers
Some persons within the church recee the a formation, usually including graduate studies in theology or divinity, and then exercising some leadership role in the community. In common usage, when someone refers to a "minister of the church" they are referring to any one of these "professional" ministers.

The Catholic Church identifies five ecclesial vocations, three of which are ordained. Theologians and lay ecclesial ministers are not necessarily ordained, while bishops, presbyters, and deacons are ordained. While only the latter are considered clergy by the Catholic Church, all are considered ministers in the professional and vocational sense.

Ministers of the sacraments

The other kind of minister in Catholic parlance is a person who administers a sacrament, meaning that he or she is a conduit of sacramental grace. This is not an office or position but instead a function that different kinds of people may perform, depending on the sacrament. There are two kinds of ministers in this sense. The ordinary minister of a sacrament, who is the standard or normal minister of that sacrament, has the spiritual power to administer it (i.e., the person's sacrament is valid), but not necessarily the canonical authority to administer it (i.e., a licit sacrament). Thus, a bishop who consecrates another bishop without pontifical mandate exercises illicitly the spiritual power to consecrate him. While bishops, priests and deacons are ordinary ministers of holy communion, only someone who has been validly ordained as a priest is a minister of the Eucharist. If a priest is, for some reason, debarred and yet celebrates the Eucharist, he does so illicitly (i.e. against canon law), but the Eucharist is still valid. However, in the case of the sacrament of Reconciliation (the Sacrament of Penance), although the priest is the minister, the only minister, since there are no extraordinary ministers of this sacrament, he must have been granted by the law itself or by a competent authority the faculty to celebrate this sacrament validly for the person to whom he imparts absolution.

An extraordinary minister of a sacrament is someone, other than an ordinary minister, officially authorized to administer a sacrament by the law itself (as an instituted acolyte is an extraordinary minister of holy communion) or by being deputed for this purpose.

Below is a table outlining each sacrament, its ordinary ministers, and its extraordinary ministers (if any), with stipulations regarding its exercise by extraordinary ministers in parenthesis.

Instituted ministries
The offices of lector (reader) and acolyte were previously minor orders; with Ministeria quaedam (1972; taking effect on 1 January 1973), Pope Paul VI abolished minor orders and the subdiaconate, creating "instituted ministries" in their stead. Since 2021, in the Latin Church, both men and women can become instituted lectors and acolytes, and catechist has been turned into an instituted ministry and is available for both sexes.

Instituted lector and acolyte 
While the approved English translations of the liturgical books of the Catholic Church's Roman Rite use the terms "instituted acolytes" and "instituted lectors" some translations refer to them as "installed". For example, the translation on the Vatican's website of the 2019 motu proprio Aperuit illis has "Bishops could celebrate the Rite of Installation of Lectors or a similar commissioning of readers".

The 1984 liturgical book Ceremonial of Bishops, says that in ceremonies where are bishop presides it is fitting that instituted acolytes and instituted lectors carry out their functions – rather than by those who have not been instituted. The 2004 Congregation for Bishops guideline Apostolorum Successores, n. 113, says: "The bishop should promote the ministries of lector and acolyte, which may be conferred upon male laypersons".

A role of the instituted lector is to proclaim the readings (except the Gospel) in liturgical celebrations. The instituted lector should do this even if ministers of higher rank are present. Other lay people do these readings at Mass in "the absence of an instituted lector".

In January 2021, with the motu proprio Spiritus Domini, Pope Francis changed the canon law of the Latin Church so that both men and women could become instituted lectors and acolytes. Previously, only men were allowed to be instituted in those ministries.

Instituted catechist 
In May 2021, Pope Francis created the instituted ministry of lay catechist with the motu proprio .

On 23 January 2022, Pope Francis installed for the first time women as instituted lectors and catechists. On this day, Pope Francis held a ceremony during which he installed six women as instituted lectors, and three women as instituted catechists, along with some men.

See also
Christianity in the 1st century#Ministry and eschatological expectations

References

Catholic ecclesiastical titles
Catholic liturgical law